Poonithura  is a region in the city of Kochi in Kerala, India.  It features one of the popular temples in Ernakulam and it has historical links to the Sree Poornathrayeesa Temple in Tripunithura.

As per the mythology it is referred in Mahabaratha as the place where Arjuna build this temple for lord Krishna in the Chapter of Santhana Gopala. It is believed that this happened here and later on the temple was moved to Tripunithura.
The temple here is called Poonithura Kottaram Sree Krishna Swami Temple. The annual 'Ashtamirohini' festival is celebrated with much fanfare by the local residents.

Pooni means the "containment for arrows ", "Thura means sea shore" . The belief is that in Mahabaratha Arjuna dropped his "puni" before lord krishna as a sign of accepting defeat in the great kurukshetra battle.

Location

Poonithura and Tripunithura 
Although Poonithura and Tripunithura are adjacent places, Poonithura comes under Kochi Municipal Corporation, whereas Tripunithura is a municipality of its own. 

Earlier, the entire area used to known as Poonithura. Later the King of the Princely state of Kochi has shifted his capital to this area from Trichur. He built palaces and fort on the land which is located on the eastern banks of Poorna River. Since then this area started to be known as Thiru Poonithura, 'Thiru' being the word in local Malayalam language to express respect. Later it became Tripunithura.

Notable people from Poonithura 
 M.S Tripunithura, Cine artist
 Tripunithura N. Radhakrishnan, Ghatam exponent

References 

Villages in Ernakulam district